Events in the year 1932 in Japan.

Incumbents
Emperor: Hirohito
Prime Minister:
Inukai Tsuyoshi: until May 15
Takahashi Korekiyo: (Acting) May 15 – May 26
Saitō Makoto: from May 26
Foreign Minister:
Saitō Makoto: until July
Uchida Kosai
Finance Minister: Takahashi Korekiyo

Governors
Aichi Prefecture: Yujiro Osaki (until 28 June); Endo Ryusaku (starting 28 June)
Akita Prefecture: Takeshi Uchida (until 28 June); Takabe Rokuzo (starting 28 June)
Aomori Prefecture: Teizaburo Miyamoto (until 28 June); Taku Yasunobu (starting 28 June)
Ehime Prefecture: Kume Shigeo (until 28 June); Jiro Ichinohe (starting 28 June)
Fukui Prefecture: Keizo Ichimura (until 8 March); Shigeo Odachi (starting 8 March)
Fukushima Prefecture: Murai Hachiro (until 28 June); Akagi Tomoharo (starting 28 June)
Gifu Prefecture: Takehiko Ito (until 28 June); Umekichi Miyawaki (starting 28 June)
Gunma Prefecture: Masao Kanazawa
Hiroshima Prefecture: Ryo Chiba (until 28 June); Michio Yuzawa (starting 28 June)
Ibaraki Prefecture: Seikichi Kimishima (until 18 June); Abe Kashichi (starting 18 June)
Iwate Prefecture: Hidehiko Ishiguro
Kagawa Prefecture: Akira Ito (until 28 June); Seikichi Kimijima (starting 28 June)
Kanagawa Prefecture: Sukenari Yokoyama (starting month unknown)
Kochi Prefecture: Kodora Akamatsu (until 4 March); Sakama Osamu (starting 4 March)
Kumamoto Prefecture: Kenichi Yamashita (until 28 June); Keiichi Suzuki (starting 28 June)
Kyoto Prefecture: Sukenari Yokoyama (until 28 June); Saito Munenori (starting 28 June)
Mie Prefecture: Hirose Hisatada
Miyagi Prefecture: Michio Yuzawa
Miyazaki Prefecture: Gisuke Kinoshita
Nagano Prefecture: Ishigaki Kuraji
Niigata Prefecture: Toyoji Obata (until 28 June); Ryo Chiba (starting 28 June)
Okinawa Prefecture: Jiro Ino
Osaka Prefecture: Saito Munenori (until month unknown); Shinobu Agata (starting month unknown)
Saga Prefecture: Saburo Hayakawa
Saitama Prefecture: Umekichi Miyawaki (until 28 June); Shigezo Fukushima (starting 28 June)
Shiname Prefecture: Rinsaku Yagi (starting 28 June); Masaki Fukumura (starting 28 June)
Tochigi Prefecture: Chokichi Toshima (until 28 June); Nakarai Kiyoshi (starting 28 June)
Tokyo: 
until 12 January: Hasegawa Hisakazu 
12 January-27 May: Shohei Fujinuma
starting 27 May: Masayasu Kouksaka
Toyama Prefecture: Keiichi Suzuki (until 28 June); Saito Itsuki (starting 28 June)
Yamagata Prefecture: Sada Kawamura (until 28 June); Ishihara Yajiro (starting 28 June)

Events
January 9 – Sakuradamon Incident (1932)
January 25 – Nippon Bakelight, later Sumitomo Bakelight was founded.
January 25–February 4 – Defense of Harbin
January 28–March 3 – January 28 Incident
February 20 – 1932 Japanese general election
May 15 – May 15 Incident
July 15 – Takashimaya Department Store in Osaka Nanba was officially open.
August 12 – Tokyo Takarazuka Cinema Production, as predecessor of Toho was founded.
September 1 – Topcon was founded.
September 15 – the Japan-Manchukuo Protocol is signed by Japan giving Japanese forces permission to station in Manchukuo
December 16 – Shirokiya Department Store fire
Winter – The Japanese Communist Party make a concerted effort to reestablish its central organization during a time of police repression
 Unknown date
 Pharmacy retailer, Matsumoto Kiyoshi founded in Matsudo, Chiba Prefecture, as predecessor name was Matsumoto Pharmacy Shop.
 Nanzan Secondary School, later Nanzan University was founded in Nagoya.

Films
Chûshingura - directed by Teinosuke Kinugasa
First Steps Ashore - directed by Yasujirô Shimazu
I Was Born, But... - directed by Yasujirō Ozu
Kokushi muso - directed by Mansaku Itami
Manmo kenkoku no reimei - directed by Kenji Mizoguchi
Nasanunaka - directed by Mikio Naruse
Spring Comes from the Ladies - directed by Yasujirô Ozu
Until the Day We Meet Again - directed by Yasujirô Ozu
Uzumaki - directed by Hiroshi Innami
Where Now Are the Dreams of Youth - directed by Yasujirō Ozu

Births
March 7 – Momoko Kōchi, actress (d. 1998)
March 31 – Nagisa Oshima, film director and screenwriter (d. 2013)
April 3 – Ineko Arima, film actress
April 4 – Meisei Goto, author (d. 1999)
June 24 – Hirohisa Fujii, politician and former Finance Minister (d. 2022)
June 25 – Ichiro Ogimura, table tennis player (d. 1994)
August 11
Asei Kobayashi, composer and lyricist (d. 2021)
Keiko Kishi, film actress and UNFPA Goodwill Ambassador
September 10 – Yasuo Yamada, voice actor (d. 1995)
September 18 – Hisashi Owada, diplomat and law professor
September 30 – Shintarō Ishihara, Japanese author and politician (d. 2022)
October 2 – Masanobu Deme, film director  (d. 2016)
November 20
Umeko Ando, Ainu singer and musician
Yorozuya Kinnosuke, kabuki actor (d. 1996)
November 23 – Kunie Tanaka, film actor
December 15 – Tatsuya Nakadai, film actor
December 25 – Jun Etō, literary critic (d. 1999)

Deaths
February 9 – Junnosuke Inoue, businessman and banker (assassinated) (b. 1869)
March 5 – Dan Takuma, businessman (assassinated) (b. 1858)
March 24  – Motojirō Kajii, writer (b. 1901)
March 26  – Kigoshi Yasutsuna, general (b. 1854)
May 15 – Inukai Tsuyoshi, politician and Prime Minister of Japan (assassinated) (b. 1855)
May 26 – Yoshinori Shirakawa, general, (b. 1869)
June 14 – Yamamoto Yaeko, nurse, wife of Joseph Hardy Neesima (b. 1845)
July 24 – Hidaka Sōnojō, admiral (b. 1848)

See also
 List of Japanese films of the 1930s

References

 
1930s in Japan
Japan
Years of the 20th century in Japan